Following is a list of all Article III United States federal judges appointed by President John Tyler during his presidency. In total Tyler appointed 7 Article III federal judges, including 1 Justice to the Supreme Court of the United States and 6 judges to the United States district courts.

Two vacancies occurred on the Supreme Court during Tyler's presidency, as Justices Smith Thompson and Henry Baldwin died in 1843 and 1844, respectively. Tyler put forward five men for Supreme Court confirmation a total of nine times. John C. Spencer, Reuben Walworth, Edward King all had their nominations scuttled more than once, and the full Senate never acted on John M. Read's nomination. Tyler's four unsuccessful nominees are the most for any U.S. president to date.

United States Supreme Court justices

District courts

Notes

References
General

 

Specific

Sources
 Federal Judicial Center

Tyler

Presidency of John Tyler